

Trinidad and Tobago at the 1994 Commonwealth Games was abbreviated TRI.

Medals

Gold
none

Silver
none

Bronze
Patrick Delice, Neil de Silva, H. Stephens, Ian Morris — Athletics, Men's 4 x 400 Metres Relay
Mike Penniston-John — Boxing, Men's Middleweight

References

1994
Commonwealth Games
Nations at the 1994 Commonwealth Games